El Retiro can refer to:

Parque del Buen Retiro, a park in Madrid, Spain
Retiro (Madrid Metro), a station on Line 2
El Retiro (Lake Wales, Florida): a former estate in Lake Wales, Florida, United States
 El Retiro, Coahuila, a town in Mexico
 El Retiro, Coclé, Panama

See also 
Retiro (disambiguation)